Ministry of Transport and Communications (abbreviated as MOTC) is a government ministry of Myanmar. The ministry is currently led by Admiral Tin Aung San. Under the state of emergency immediately after the 2021 coup, he was appointed by the State Administration Council on 3 February 2021. In this regard, the Committee Representing Pyidaungsu Hluttaw claims that the military regime's cabinet is illegitimate.

History 
On 29 January 1992, the Ministry of Transport and Communications was organized with Ministry of Transport, Ministry of Rail Transportation and Ministry of Communications, Post and Telegraph.

On 9 November 2012, the Ministry's name was changed as Ministry of Communications and Information Technology.

On 30 March 2016, it was changed as Ministry of Transport and Communications by Htin Kyaw's new government.

In 2019 and 2020, the Ministry ordered Telenor Myanmar to stop providing service to townships in Rakhine State and Chin State, citing the Rohingya conflict.

Organization
According to the official website of the Ministry of Transport and Communications as of April 17, 2021.

Minister's office
Office of the Minister of Transportation and Communications

Administrations
Department of Transportation Planning
Road Transport Administration Department
Department of Civil Aviation 
Department of Meteorology and Hydrology
Department of Marine Administration
Directorate of Water Resources and Improvement of River Systems 
Post and Telecommunications Department (Jurisdiction includes administration of telecoms carriers  and internet service providers.)
Information Technology and Cyber Security Department

State-owned enterprises
Myanma Railways
Road Transport
Myanmar National Airlines
Myanma Port Authority
Myanmar Shipyards
Inland Water Transport 
Myanma Posts and Telecommunications
Myanmar Post

Educational institutions
Central Institute of Transport and Communications
Myanmar Maritime University 
Myanmar Mercantile Marine College

See also 
Transport in Myanmar
Telecommunications in Myanmar
Internet in Myanmar

References 

TransportandCommunications
Myanmar
Myanmar
Transport organisations based in Myanmar